Platypus is a weevil genus in the subfamily Platypodinae.

Species 
 Platypus apicalis White, 1846
 Platypus australis Chapuis, 1865
 Platypus calamus
 Platypus cylindrus (Fabricius, 1792)
 Platypus contaminatus
 Platypus gracilis
 Platypus hamatus
 Platypus kiushuensis
 Platypus lewisi
 Platypus modestus
 Platypus parallelus (Fabricius, 1801)
 Platypus quercivorus Murayama, 1925
 Platypus severini
 Platypus solidus
 Platypus taiwansis

References 

Platypodinae